This is a list of notable alumni of Shaw University in Raleigh, North Carolina.

Notable alumni

Academics 
 Ezekiel Ezra Smith (A.B. 1878), president of Fayetteville State University and U.S. Ambassador to Liberia (1888–1890).
 Edward Hart Lipscombe (A.B. 1879, A.M. 1882), educator, minister, principal of the Western Union Institute.
 Charles L. Purce, (A.B.) president of Selma University and Simmons College of Kentucky.
 James B. Dudley (A.B. 1881), professor and president of North Carolina A&T State University (1896–1925).
 Peter Weddick Moore (A.B. 1887), founder and first president of Elizabeth City Normal College, (now Elizabeth City State University).
 James E. Shepard (A.B. 1894), founder and first president of North Carolina Central University.
 John O. Crosby (1914), founder and first president of North Carolina A&T State University.
 Benjamin Arthur Quarles (B.A. 1931), historian, administrator, scholar, educator, and writer.
 James E. Cheek (B.A. 1955), president of Shaw University, president emeritus of Howard University, 1983 recipient of the Presidential Medal of Freedom.
 William L. Pollard (B.A. 1967), president of the Medgar Evers College (2009–2013).

Arts and entertainment 
 Gladys Knight (B.A. 1966 and honorary doctorate), singer, Gladys Knight & the Pips, member of the Rock and Roll Hall of Fame, received Honorary Doctorate.
 Shirley Caesar (B.S. 1984), pastor and gospel music artist.
 Lords of the Underground (Attended), hip-hop group that was founded in the early 1990s, when all three of its members were students attending Shaw University.

Business 
 Calvin E. Lightner (1907 or 1908), architect and mortician.
 Ida Van Smith (1939), one of the first African American female pilots and flight instructors in the United States.
 Lee Johnson (1975), president & CEO of Mechanics & Farmers Bank.
 Celeste Beatty (1984), first black female brewery owner.
 Willie Otey Kay (1912), prominent dressmaker in Raleigh
 William Gaston Pearson (1886), prominent principal, colloquially referred to as "Durham's Black Superintendent", in Durham, NC, and co-founder of Mechanics & Farmers Bank.

Civil rights 
 Max Yergan (1914), civil rights activist; Spingarn Medal recipient.
 Ella Baker (1927), leader of SNCC and civil rights activist.
 Eleanor Nunn, Ph.D., Civil rights activist (one of founders of SNCC) and educator, North Carolina State University.

Government 
 Edward A. Johnson (B.L. 1891), first African-American member of the New York state legislature when he was elected to the New York State Assembly in 1917.
 Col. James H. Young, prominent North Carolina politician and first African American to hold the rank of colonel in the United States of the volunteer regiment during the Spanish–American War.
 Henry Plummer Cheatham (A.B. 1882), Republican member of the United States House of Representatives from 1889 to 1893.
 Adam Clayton Powell, Jr.,(D.D. 1934), Congressman from New York, 1945–71.
 Angie Brooks (B.S. 1949), first African female President of the United Nations General Assembly and Associate Justice to the National Supreme Court of Liberia.
 Rita Walters (1952), member of Board of Library Commissioners for the Los Angeles Public Library.
 Vernon Malone (1953), Democratic member of the North Carolina General Assembly, 14th Senate district, including constituents in Wake County.
 Luther Jordan (B.A. 1997), member of the North Carolina Senate from 1993 to 2002.
 Thomas O. Fuller State senator of the North Carolina Senate in 1898

Law 
 Roger Demosthenes O'Kelly (B.L. 1909), lawyer, first deaf and black lawyer.
 Glenford Eckleton Mitchell (B.A. 1960), member of Universal House of Justice (1982–2008).
 Willie E. Gary (B.A. 1971), one of the world's wealthiest attorneys, known as the "Whale Killer" and co-founder of the Black Family Channel.

Journalism 
 Lenard Moore (B.A. 1980), first African American President of the Haiku Society of America.
 Shelia P. Moses (B.A. 1983), best selling author, nominated for the National Book Award & NAACP Image Award.

Religion 
 Richard Gene Arno, founder of the National Christian Counselors Association.
 William R. Pettiford (1912 honorary), Birmingham, Alabama minister and banker.
 Lucius Walker (1954), Baptist minister best known for his opposition to the United States embargo against Cuba.

Science and medicine 
 Louise Celia Fleming (1885) black medical missionary (1862-1899).
 Manassa Thomas Pope (1885), prominent physician in Raleigh; ran for mayor in 1919.
 Dr. John Eagles, pharmacy owner in Raleigh, North Carolina and son of John S. W. Eagles, sergeant in U.S.C.T., public official, and state legislator in North Carolina

Sports 
 Carrenza M. "Schoolboy" Howard, Negro Leagues pitcher
 Charlie Brandon (1964), Grey Cup champion and all-star CFL football player.
 Van Green (1973), NFL player.
 James "Bonecrusher" Smith (B.A. 1975), first heavyweight boxing champion with a college degree.
 Ronald "Flip" Murray (2002), professional basketball player.
 Julius Gregory (2011), Arena Football League player.

Presidents of Shaw University

References 

 
Shaw University